Altica aenescens is a species of leaf beetle from the subfamily Galerucinae. It is distributed in Northern and Central Europe, as far south as northern Italy. Parts of Northern Europe include Belarus, Belgium, Finland, and Sweden.

References

Beetles described in 1888
Beetles of Europe
Alticini
Taxa named by Julius Weise